William Chadwick may refer to:

People

 William Chadwick (bishop) (1905–1991), Bishop of Barking, 1959–1975
 William Chadwick (footballer), English footballer for Port Vale 1901–1904
 William Chadwick (painter) (1879–1962), British-born American Impressionist painter
 William Owen Chadwick (1916–2015), British professor, writer and historian of Christianity
 Bill Chadwick (1915–2009), first U.S.-born referee to serve in the National Hockey League
 Billy Chadwick (footballer) (born 2000), English footballer
 Billy Chadwick, CSI:Miami character played by Lew Temple

Other
 William Chadwick (USCG) namesake for the 50th Sentinel class cutter
 USCGC William Chadwick (WPC-1150) will be the 50th Sentinel class cutter

See also
 William Chadwick Bourchier (1852–1924), Dean of Cashel